Ətcələr (also, Etcheler and Etchelyar) is a village and municipality in the Sabirabad Rayon of Azerbaijan.  It has a population of 1,210.

References 

Populated places in Sabirabad District